PORCN (porcupine homolog – Drosophila) is a human gene.
The protein is homologous to other membrane-bound O-acyltransferases.

Function
The protein encoded by this gene is an endoplasmic reticulum transmembrane protein involved in processing of wingless proteins such as WNT7A. It performs O-Palmitoleoylation of these proteins.

Clinical significance
Mutations in this gene are associated with focal dermal hypoplasia.

Mutations in PORCN are associated to Goltz-Gorlin syndrome.

Ligands

Inhibitors
 WNT974 (LGK-974) - 1243244-14-5, researched for anti-cancer effects in Wnt-pathway sensitive tumours. Also investigated for influencing cardiac tissue remodelling following infarction.

IWP (1-4)

RXC004

References